The Negishi Stakes (Japanese 根岸ステークス) is a Grade 3 horse race for Thoroughbreds aged four and over, run in February over a distance of 1400 metres on dirt at Tokyo Racecourse.

The Negishi Stakes was first run in 1987 and has held Grade 3 status ever since. The race was contested over 1200 metres from 1990 to  2000 and again in 2003. The 2003 edition was run at Nakayama Racecourse. The race is named in honour of Negishi Racecourse, a former horse racing venue in Yokohama.

Winners since 2000

Earlier winners

 1987 - Grace Shiraoki
 1988 - Winning Smile
 1989 - Dyna Letter
 1990 - Eiko Trans
 1991 - Tomoe Regent
 1992 - Happy Guinness
 1993 - Prost Line
 1994 - Fujino Makken O
 1995 - Young Ebros
 1996 - Stone Stepper
 1997 - Washington Color
 1998 - Washington Color
 1999 - Select Green

See also
 Horse racing in Japan
 List of Japanese flat horse races

References

Dirt races in Japan